The 1911 Kansas vs. Missouri football game was a college football game between the University of Kansas and the University of Missouri played on November 25, 1911 at Rollins Field in Columbia, Missouri. It is widely considered, although contested, to be the first college football homecoming game ever played.

The Missouri Tigers, under coach Chester Brewer entered the game with a record of 2 wins, 4 losses, and 1 tie. The Kansas Jayhawks, led by Ralph W. Sherwin brought a record of 4 wins, 2 losses, and 1 tie. The game ended in a 3–3 tie and was the final game of the season for both schools.

More than 1,000 people gathered in downtown Lawrence, Kansas to watch a mechanical reproduction of the game while it was being played. A Western Union telegraph wire was set up direct from Columbia, with information "broadcast" to Lawrence. A group of people then would announce the results of the previous play and used a large model of a football playing field to show the results. Those in attendance would cheer as though they were watching the game live, including the school's Rock Chalk, Jayhawk cheer.

See also
 Border War (Kansas–Missouri rivalry)
 1911 college football season
 List of historically significant college football games

References

1911 college football season
vs. Missouri 1911
vs. Kansas 1911
November 1911 sports events
1911 in sports in Missouri
Events in Columbia, Missouri
20th century in Columbia, Missouri
Sports in Columbia, Missouri